Pancreatic ribonuclease family (RNase, RNase I, RNase A, pancreatic RNase, ribonuclease I, endoribonuclease I, ribonucleic phosphatase, alkaline ribonuclease, ribonuclease, gene S glycoproteins, Ceratitis capitata alkaline ribonuclease, SLSG glycoproteins, gene S locus-specific glycoproteins, S-genotype-assocd. glycoproteins, ribonucleate 3'-pyrimidino-oligonucleotidohydrolase) is a superfamily of pyrimidine-specific endonucleases found in high quantity in the pancreas of certain mammals and of some reptiles.

Specifically, the enzymes are involved in endonucleolytic cleavage of 3'-phosphomononucleotides and 3'-phosphooligonucleotides ending in C-P or U-P with 2',3'-cyclic phosphate intermediates. Ribonuclease can unwind the RNA helix by complexing with single-stranded RNA; the complex arises by an extended multi-site cation-anion interaction between lysine and arginine residues of the enzyme and phosphate groups of the nucleotides.

Notable family members

Bovine pancreatic ribonuclease is the best-studied member of the family and has served as a model system in work related to protein folding, disulfide bond formation, protein crystallography and spectroscopy, and protein dynamics. Human genome contains 8 genes that share the structure and function with bovine pancreatic ribonuclease, with 5 additional pseudo-genes. These structure and dynamics of these enzymes are related to their diverse biological functions.

Other proteins belonging to the pancreatic ribonuclease superfamily include: bovine seminal vesicle and brain ribonucleases; kidney non-secretory ribonucleases; liver-type ribonucleases; angiogenin, which induces vascularisation of normal and malignant tissues; eosinophil cationic protein, a cytotoxin and helminthotoxin with ribonuclease activity; and frog liver ribonuclease and frog sialic acid-binding lectin. The sequence of pancreatic ribonucleases contains four conserved disulfide bonds and three amino acid residues involved in the catalytic activity.

Human genes 
Human genes encoding proteins containing this domain include:
 ANG,
 RNASE1, RNASE10, RNASE12, RNASE2, RNASE3, RNASE4, RNASE6, RNASE7, and RNASE8.

Cytotoxicity

Some members of the pancreatic ribonuclease family have cytotoxic effects. Mammalian cells are protected from these effects due to their extremely high affinity for ribonuclease inhibitor (RI), which protects cellular RNA from degradation by pancreatic ribonucleases. Pancreatic ribonucleases that are not inhibited by RI are approximately as toxic as alpha-sarcin, diphtheria toxin, or ricin.

Two pancreatic ribonucleases isolated from the oocytes of the Northern leopard frog - amphinase and ranpirnase - are not inhibited by RI and show differential cytotoxicity against tumor cells. Ranpirnase was studied in a Phase III clinical trial as a treatment candidate for mesothelioma, but the trial did not demonstrate statistical significance against primary endpoints.

References 

Ribonucleases
EC 3.1.27
Protein domains